Zajączkowo  is a village in the administrative district of Gmina Grodziczno, within Nowe Miasto County, Warmian-Masurian Voivodeship, in northern Poland.

References

Villages in Nowe Miasto County